The 1946 National League was the 12th season of the highest tier of motorcycle speedway in Great Britain and the first post-war season.

The league had been abandoned seven years previously due to the outbreak of World War II. Record attendances were attracted with Wembley Lions attracting an average of 50,000 and the league as a whole a total of six and a half million. From the abandoned 1939 season, Southampton Saints and Harringay Tigers were no longer racing whilst Odsal Boomerangs brought National League speedway to Bradford for the first time.

Wembley Lions won their second National League title.

On 6 July, a crowd of 34,0000 at Odsal Stadium witnessed Odsal Boomerangs lose to Belle Vue Aces. During the match Albert 'Aussie' Rosenfeld, son of Albert Rosenfeld hit the fence and was taken to St Luke's Hospital, Bradford, with a suspected fractured skull. He died 10 days later, on 16 July 1946.

National League Final table

On account of the small number of teams in the league the ACU Cup was run in a league format. Belle Vue Aces came out on top.

A.C.U. Cup final table

Such was the dearth of new riders caused by the war that all of the top ten riders were established pre-war riders and none were below the age of 32.

Top Ten Riders (League only)

National Trophy
The 1946 National Trophy was the tenth edition (if including the 1939 abandoned competition) or ninth edition (if not including) of the Knockout Cup. Teams from the lower 1946 Speedway Northern League competed in the event.

First round

Second round

Quarterfinals

Semifinals

Final

First leg

Second leg

Belle Vue were National Trophy Champions, winning on aggregate 109–106.

See also
 List of United Kingdom Speedway League Champions
 Knockout Cup (speedway)

References

Speedway National League
1946 in speedway
1946 in British motorsport